God Shuffled His Feet is the second album by Canadian band Crash Test Dummies, released in 1993. It features their most popular single, "Mmm Mmm Mmm Mmm". The cover art superimposes the band members' faces over the figures of Titian's painting Bacchus and Ariadne. It was their most successful album commercially, as it sold over eight million copies worldwide.

Reception

The album was the band's biggest mainstream hit. AllMusic writer Stephen Thomas Erlewine attributes the album's success to "Jerry Harrison's remarkably clear and focused production" and that "apart from the relatively concise pop smarts of the singles "Mmm Mmm Mmm Mmm" and "Afternoons and Coffeespoons," God Shuffled His Feet isn't all that different from the band's first album."

Commercial performance
God Shuffled His Feet was a number-one album in Austria and New Zealand, and also reached the top five in the national albums charts of numerous countries such as Australia, Norway, Sweden and Switzerland. In addition, the album reached number six in the Netherlands national albums chart, number two in the UK Albums Chart, and number nine in the United States Billboard 200 albums chart. In their native Canada, it never reached higher than number 11 on the national charts, but fueled by the success of its four singles (all Top 20 hits there) the album eventually reached triple platinum status.

Track listing

Personnel
Crash Test Dummies
Benjamin Darvill – harmonicas, mandolin, acoustic guitar
Michel Dorge – drums, percussion
Ellen Reid – piano, keyboards, accordion, backing vocals
Brad Roberts – lead vocals, acoustic and electric guitars, piano on "Untitled"
Dan Roberts – bass guitars, synth bass, backing vocals

Additional musicians
Larry Beers – drums on "Afternoons & Coffeespoons", "In the Days of the Caveman", and "When I Go out with Artists"
Adrian Belew – synthesized guitars on "God Shuffled His Feet"
Kerry Nation – backing vocals on "Afternoons & Coffeespoons"

Charts

Weekly charts

Year-end charts

Certifications

References

External links

1993 albums
Albums produced by Jerry Harrison
Arista Records albums
Bertelsmann Music Group albums
Crash Test Dummies albums